The New Republic: The Last Command Sourcebook is a 1994 role-playing game supplement published by West End Games for Star Wars: The Roleplaying Game.

Contents
The Last Command Sourcebook is a sourcebook covering the final novel in the New Republic trilogy by Timothy Zahn.

Reviews
Dragon #210

See also
 Heir to the Empire Sourcebook, based on Zahn's first novel in the Thrawn Trilogy.
 Dark Force Rising Sourcebook, based on Zahn's second novel in the Thrawn Trilogy.

References

Role-playing game supplements introduced in 1994
Star Wars: The Roleplaying Game supplements
Thrawn